The women's slalom at the 1999 Asian Winter Games was held on 5 February 1999 at the Yongpyong Resort in South Korea.

Schedule
All times are Korea Standard Time (UTC+09:00)

Results
Legend
DNF1 — Did not finish run 1
DNF2 — Did not finish run 2
DSQ2 — Disqualified run 2

References

Results

External links
Schedule

Men slalom